Coccothrinax salvatoris is a palm which is endemic to eastern and east central Cuba.

Two subspecies are recognised: Coccothrinax salvatoris subsp. loricata and Coccothrinax salvatoris subsp. salvatoris.

References

salvatoris
Trees of Cuba
Plants described in 1939